General Officer Staff (Heneralna starshyna) was a council of high-ranking officers who advised to Hetman on all affairs.123 It was the highest state administration of Cossack Hetmanate. General officers took part in the General Military Council and along with colonels composed the Council of Officers. In a peacetime the general officers acted as ministers. General officers took part in the General Military Council and along with colonels composed the Council of Officers.

It was created in 1648 and existed after the liquidation of the Cossack Hetmanate in 1764 until 1782. In an absence of a hetman, any members of the staff could have performed functions of the acting hetman. General officers were headed by the Hetman of Zaporizhian Host. 

Aside of General Officers Staff there also were Regimental and Company officers staffs as part of administrative division of the Cossack Hetmanate. All officers were known as starshyna which literally means a senior. In charge of regiments stood colonel (polkovnyk) and in charge of companies stood captain (sotnyk).

The staff consisted of nine members: 
 Quartermaster general, 
 two Judge advocate generals – General Military Court, 
 Scribe general (pysar) – General Military Chancellery, 
 Treasury general – General Treasury,
 two Adjutant generals (osaul), 
 Ensign general (khorunzhy), 
 Bunchuk general (bunchuzhny)

See also
Governing Council of the Hetman Office

References

External links
 General Officer Staff at the Encyclopedia of Ukraine

Political history of Ukraine
Government of Ukraine
Ukraine
General Officer Staff (Hetmanate)
Government of the Cossack Hetmanate